JBU may refer to:
 Japan Federation of Basic Industry Workers' Unions, a Japanese trade union
 JetBlue, an American airline
 Jim Baen's Universe, an online magazine
 John Brown University
 Jukun Takum language
 Jutland Football Association, now DBU Jutland